Bani Yas is a tribal confederation of Najdi origin in the United Arab Emirates. The tribal coalition which consists of tribes from Dubai to Khawr al Udayd southeast of Qatar, was called the Bani Yas Coalition. The tribe has been led by their rulers, the Al Nahyan, who had their headquarters in Al Dhafra and now in Abu Dhabi. The ruling family of the United Arab Emirates and Abu Dhabi, Al Nahyan, which is a branch of Al-Falahi, belongs to and rules this tribe, as do the emirs of Dubai, Al Maktoum, which is a branch of Al-Falasi.

History
Bani Yas had close relations with the Dhawahir tribe, which was traditionally at odds with al Naimi and Bani Ka’ab in Buraimi Oasis.

Branches
Bani Yas consists of several branches, which are:
Al Bu Falasi (آل بو فلاسه)
Al Qubaisi (قبيسي)
Al Bu Falah (آل بو فلاح)
Al Romaithi (الرميثي )
Al Bu Muhair (آل بو مهير)
Al Hameli (الهملي )
Al mehairi (المهاري)
Al Suwaidi (السويدي)
Al Qamzi  (القمزان)
Al Marar (المرر)
Al Mazrouie (المزروعي )

See also
Royal families of the United Arab Emirates
Banu Amir
Hawazin

References

Society of the United Arab Emirates
Society of Qatar
Society of Saudi Arabia
Tribes of Arabia
Tribes of the United Arab Emirates